Lorraine Baumann (born 1 October 1993) is a French badminton player. She started playing badminton at aged 8 with her father and brother Marin Baumann, then in 2011, she joined France national badminton team. In 2015, he became the runner-up of Slovenia International tournament in mixed doubles event with Marin Baumann.

Achievements

BWF International Challenge/Series 
Women's doubles

  BWF International Challenge tournament
  BWF International Series tournament
  BWF Future Series tournament

References

External links 
 

1993 births
Living people
Sportspeople from Nancy, France
French female badminton players
Badminton players at the 2015 European Games
European Games competitors for France
21st-century French women